Zielona Góra is a village in the administrative district of Gmina Lubichowo, within Starogard County, Pomeranian Voivodeship, in northern Poland. It is located within the ethnocultural region of Kociewie in the historic region of Pomerania.

The village has a population of 214.

Zielona Góra was a royal village of the Polish Crown, administratively located in the Tczew County in the Pomeranian Voivodeship.

During the German occupation of Poland (World War II), in 1942, several Poles from Zielona Góra were expelled to the General Government, and their farms were handed over to German colonists as part of the Lebensraum policy.

References

Villages in Starogard County